Giovanni Battista De Pace, C.O. (5 June 1627 – 20 November 1698) was a Roman Catholic prelate who served as Bishop of Capaccio (1684–1698).

Biography
Giovanni Battista De Pace was born in Naples, Italy on 5 June 1627 and ordained a priest in the Oratory of Saint Philip Neri. On 5 June 1684, he was appointed during the papacy of Pope Innocent XI as Bishop of Capaccio. On 11 June 1684, he was consecrated bishop by Alessandro Crescenzi (cardinal), Cardinal-Priest of Santa Prisca, with Pier Antonio Capobianco, Bishop Emeritus of Lacedonia, and Francesco Maria Giannotti, Bishop of Segni, serving as co-consecrators. He served as Bishop of Capaccio until his death on 20 November 1698.

References

External links and additional sources
 (for Chronology of Bishops) 
 (for Chronology of Bishops) 

17th-century Italian Roman Catholic bishops
Bishops appointed by Pope Innocent XI
1627 births
1698 deaths